Terei or Buin, also known as Telei, Rugara, is the most populous Papuan language spoken to the east of New Guinea. There are about 27,000 speakers in the Buin District of Bougainville Province, Papua New Guinea.

Phonology 
The phonology of the Buin language:

The /ɡ/ sound does not occur word-initially and is often fricativised as [ɣ]. The phoneme /ɾ/ following an /n/ is pronounced as [d], and also occurs as [l] for an allophonic variant. When a /t/ sound occurs before an /i/, it is always pronounced as [tsi], and when occurring before a /u/ or /a/, it may be realized as [tsu] or [tsa] depending on the dialect.

References

External links 
 Paradisec has a number of collections with materials for Terei language two collections of Arthur Cappell's materials (AC1, AC2).

Languages of the Autonomous Region of Bougainville
South Bougainville languages